Events in the year 2019 in Jamaica.

Incumbents
 Monarch: Elizabeth II
 Governor-General: Patrick Allen
 Prime Minister: Andrew Holness
 Chief Justice: Zaila McCalla

Events

Politics 

 April 4 – 2019 Portland Eastern by-election

Sports
26 July to 11 August – Jamaica competed in the 2019 Pan American Games in Lima, Peru

Deaths

2 February –Lynvale Bloomfield (b. 1959).
11 February – Delroy Poyser, long jumper (b. 1962).

8 March – Cynthia Thompson, Olympic sprinter (b. 1922).

References

 
2010s in Jamaica
Years of the 21st century in Jamaica
Jamaica
Jamaica